Mankhurd (Pronunciation: [maːnkʰuɾd̪(ə)]) is a suburb in eastern Mumbai, Maharashtra. Mankhurd railway station is on the Harbour Line of the Mumbai Suburban Railway.

Geography
The Mankhurd suburb is part of and the easternmost boundary of the municipal ward M-East.

Schools

 Kendriya Vidyalaya Mankhurd
 GOOD SHEPHERD ENGLISH HIGH SCHOOL
Mohite Patil vidyalaya Mankhurd
Sai vidyalaya Mankhurd
 Nutan VidyaMandir,Mankhurd.
 Padua High School

Government institutions
The Navjivan Sudhar Kendra (aka Navjivan Mahila Vustigruh) is a shelter for rescued women (women rescued by the police during raids in bars and brothels). The inmates are sheltered here pending the resolution of their respective cases in civil and criminal courts. This institution has been in the news recently when 17 inmates escaped from the shelter. In the subsequent investigation by both government and media agencies, the administration of the shelter has been thoroughly criticised. A report by a Mumbai High Court-appointed committee calls it "a living hell".

See also
 Govandi
Lalubhai Compound
Deonar dumping ground
Mankhurd railway station

References

Suburbs of Mumbai